Thomas William Keenlyside (born 1950) is a Canadian saxophonist and flautist from Vancouver, British Columbia, Canada.

Biography 
Born and raised in Vancouver, Keenlyside grew up hearing many genres of music on the radio that his parents left turned on much of the time. When he was twelve years old, he started playing trumpet. A year later while he was walking to school, he stopped by a friend's house and heard "Strange Meadowlark" by the Dave Brubeck Quartet coming from the house. He was overwhelmed when he heard Paul Desmond's solo, and he resolved to pursue a career in music. A couple years later he became interested in the flute and took lessons.

Keenlyside began playing professionally at bars and clubs. He continued this work while attending the University of British Columbia in Vancouver. For six years he was a member of Sunshyne, a progressive rock band, and played in R&B bands. He heard jazz musicians when the performed at clubs in Vancouver. In the 1970s as a freelance musician he worked with Natalie Cole, Dizzy Gillespie, and Mel Torme. He played for conductor Don Costa and in the house band for a Tom Jones television series. He was also played table tennis often with his friends. When jazz trumpeter Chet Baker was in town, they played a doubles match with Baker.

He became a member of the band Skywalk after it was started by Graeme Coleman and Rene Worst in 1979. The band wanted to blend pop music with more complex harmonies, modeling themselves on the jazz fusion band Weather Report. After appearing at the Detroit-Montreux Jazz Festival, they recorded the album Silent Witness and toured the U.S. After Coleman left the band, Miles Black and Don Powrie became members and the band moved in a jazzier direction.

In the 1980s, Keenlyside also toured Canada with the Tom Keenlyside Quintet. He arranged tracks, collaborated, and recorded with Aerosmith,  Bon Jovi, Mötley Crüe, INXS, David Lee Roth, and Van Halen.

He has worked in the band Altered Laws with Miles Black, Miles Foxx Hill, and Bernie Arai.

The Marguerita Horns 
When working on the Aerosmith albums, Permanent Vacation, Pump, and Get a Grip; Keenyside was a part of The Marguerita Horns' who were:
Tom Keenlyside - tenor saxophone and clarinet
Ian Putz - baritone saxophone
Bob Rogers - trombone
Henry Christian - trumpet
Bruce Fairbairn - trumpet

Discography

As co-leader
With Skywalk
 1979 Paradiso
 1984 Silent Witness
 1986 The Bohemians
 1992 Larger Than Life

With Altered Laws
 2007 Metaphora featuring The Babayaga String Quartet and Melody Diachun
 2007 Outsiders

As sideman
 1977 Prism, Prism
 1978 Street Action, Bachman–Turner Overdrive
 1984 Look in Look Out, Chilliwack
 1986 Slippery When Wet, Bon Jovi
 1987 Permanent Vacation, Aerosmith
 1989 Dr. Feelgood, Mötley Crüe
 1991 A Little Ain't Enough, David Lee Roth
 1993 Get a Grip, Aerosmith
 1992 If the Shoe Fits..., Norman Foote
 1995 Shake a Leg, Norman Foote
 1999 The Ladder, Yes
 2002 Eternity, Mythos
 2005 Domestic Rendez-vous, Norman Foote
 2006 Synergy, Miles Black
 2006 Dreams & Places, Melody Diachun
 2007 Downtown East Side Picnic, Bob Murphy

References

External links
 Tom Keenlyside Official Site

1950 births
Living people
Canadian jazz flautists
Canadian jazz saxophonists
Male saxophonists
Musicians from Vancouver
21st-century saxophonists
21st-century Canadian male musicians
Canadian male jazz musicians
21st-century flautists